The Men's time trial took place at 13 October 2010 at the Noida Expressway. The race started at 13:00 and covered 40 km.

Final classification
62 riders competed:

External links
 Commonwealth Games, Road, ITT 2010 cyclingarchives.com

Cycling at the 2010 Commonwealth Games
Road cycling at the Commonwealth Games
2010 in road cycling